Tolima may refer to:

 Tolima Department of Colombia
 Nevado del Tolima, a volcano in Colombia
 Deportes Tolima, a Colombian football (soccer) team in the First Division 
 Tolima State, Colombia, which existed from 1861 to 1869
 Tolima or Panche, an indigenous group in Colombia
 Old Armenian name for Tolma
 Tolima (moth), a genus of moths in the tribe Anerastiini
 Valle Tolima, an area of Caguas, Puerto Rico